Our Man in Jamaica/Operation Jamaica is a 1965 Italian Spanish German international co-production Eurospy adventure film directed by an uncredited Mel Welles.

Plot
Agent 001 Ken Stewart is sent to Jamaica to locate the missing Agent 009 who vanished investigating an arms smuggling operation.  After two of Stewart's friends are found dead of electrocution, 001's investigation leads him to an expatriate American criminal who was sentenced to the electric chair but escaped from prison. Seeking revenge, he assembles an army of terrorists based on an island seven miles from Jamaica called Dominica. His arms smuggling is the beginning of a scheme to attack the United States with the aid of Red China and Cuba. The film was made during the April Revolution and Foreign Intervention in the Dominican Republic.

Cast
Larry Pennell ...  Agent 001 Ken Stewart (credited as Alessandro Pennelli) 
Margitta Scherr ...  Jane Peacock  
Wolfgang Kieling... Elmer Hayes/Nick
Brad Harris ...  Captain Mike Jefferson
Barbara Valentin ...  Gloria 
Linda Sini ...  Signora Cervantes 
John Bartha   ... Ship's captain
Ralph Baldwin ... Gil 
Nando Angelini  ... Bar thug 
Rolf Lüder  ... Agent 009 Larry Peacock
Robert Camardiel ... Bar owner
Christine Schuberth ... Duped girlfriend
Donald Anderson ... Jamaican Gun Runner #1

Soundtrack
Music by Marcello Giombini  
 Un Uomo Come Te
Performed by Maria Cristina Landi  
 Io Lo
Performed by Maria Cristina Landi

Bibliography

Notes

External links 
 

1965 films
1965 adventure films
1960s spy thriller films
Italian adventure films
Italian spy thriller films
German adventure films
German spy thriller films
West German films
1960s Italian-language films
Films set in Jamaica
Films shot in Jamaica
Films scored by Marcello Giombini
1960s Italian films
1960s German films